t Zand is a hamlet in the Dutch province of North Brabant, in the municipality of Alphen-Chaam.

It was first mentioned in 1980 and means sand. 't Zand is a villa ward and recreational site near Alphen. There are no place name signs. It consists of about 100 houses excluding the holiday homes.

In 1939, a little chapel dedicated to Saint Willibrord was erected on the Oude Maastrichtsebaan in 't Zand. According to legend, Willibrord baptised people from Alphen near a well and it turned into a site of pilgrimage. Father Binck together with the archaeologist Joan Willems set out to find the spot and discovered a  loam well in the forest. It was restored in stone and a chapel was built on top of the well. The chapel was destroyed in 1945, and rebuilt in 1946.

References 

Populated places in North Brabant
Alphen-Chaam